The Ven. John Lewis Edwards (1889-1976) was Archdeacon of St Asaph from 1959 until his retirement in 1964.

He was  educated at St David's College, Lampeter, and Keble College, Oxford, and ordained in 1915. He began his career with  curacies at Minera and Rhyl. After this he held incumbencies at Llanfwrog, Rhosllannerchrugog, Llanrhos and Deganwy. He was Rural Dean of Llanrwst until his appointment as Archdeacon.

Notes

Alumni of the University of Wales, Lampeter
Alumni of Keble College, Oxford
20th-century Welsh Anglican priests
Archdeacons of St Asaph
1889 births
1976 deaths